Cristian Favela (born 12 November 1979) is a Mexican professional boxer. He is a former WBC Continental Americas featherweight champion.

Professional career
On 15 October 2010, Favela knocked out the veteran Alfredo Valenzuela at the Hotel Imperial in Agua Prieta, Sonora, Mexico.

Professional Record

|- style="margin:0.5em auto; font-size:95%;"
|align="center" colspan=8|38 Wins (24 knockouts, 14 decisions), 32 Losses (2 knockouts, 30 decisions), 5 Draws|- style="margin:0.5em auto; font-size:95%;"
|align=center style="border-style: none none solid solid; background: #e3e3e3"|Res.|align=center style="border-style: none none solid solid; background: #e3e3e3"|Record|align=center style="border-style: none none solid solid; background: #e3e3e3"|Opponent|align=center style="border-style: none none solid solid; background: #e3e3e3"|Type|align=center style="border-style: none none solid solid; background: #e3e3e3"|Rd., Time|align=center style="border-style: none none solid solid; background: #e3e3e3"|Date|align=center style="border-style: none none solid solid; background: #e3e3e3"|Location|align=center style="border-style: none none solid solid; background: #e3e3e3"|Notes'''
|-align=center
|-align=center
|Loss|| 38-32-5 ||align=left| Jose Zepeda
||| 6,2:11 ||   || align=left|  
|align=left|
|-align=center
|Loss|| 38-31-5 ||align=left| Pedro Campa
||| 6 ||   || align=left|  
|align=left|
|-align=center
|Win|| 38-30-5 ||align=left| Luis Rey
||| 6 ||   || align=left|  
|align=left|
|-align=center
|Win|| 37-30-5 ||align=left| Alejandro Pena
||| 2,1:38 ||   || align=left|  
|align=left|
|-align=center
|Loss|| 36-30-5 ||align=left| Silverio Ortiz
||| 10 ||   || align=left|  
|align=left|
|-align=center
|Win|| 36-29-5 ||align=left| Daniel Eduardo Yocupicio
||| 6 ||   || align=left|  
|align=left|
|-align=center
|Win|| 35-29-5 ||align=left| Roberto Vera Ibarra
||| 2 ||   || align=left|  
|align=left|
|-align=center
|Win|| 34-29-5 ||align=left| Carlos Urrea
||| 3 ||   || align=left|  
|align=left|
|-align=center
|Loss|| 33-29-5 ||align=left| Mauricio Herrera
||| 8 ||   || align=left|  
|align=left|
|-align=center
|Loss|| 33-28-5 ||align=left| Jessie Vargas
||| 8 ||   || align=left|  
|align=left|
|-align=center
|Loss|| 33-27-5 ||align=left| Alan Sanchez
||| 8 ||   || align=left|  
|align=left|
|-align=center
|Win|| 33-26-5 ||align=left| Alfredo Valenzuela
||| 2 ||   || align=left|  
|align=left|
|-align=center
|style="background: #dae2f1"|Draw|| 32-26-5 ||align=left| Lanardo Tyner
||| 8 ||   || align=left|  
|align=left|
|-align=center
|Loss|| 32-26-4 ||align=left| Abdullai Amidu
||| 6 ||   || align=left|  
|align=left|
|-align=center
|Loss|| 32-25-4 ||align=left| Anthony Martinez
||| 4 ||   || align=left|  
|align=left|
|-align=center
|Loss|| 32-24-4 ||align=left| Art Hovhannisyan
||| 8 ||   || align=left|  
|align=left|
|-align=center
|Loss|| 32-23-4 ||align=left| Luis Grajeda
||| 6 ||   || align=left|  
|align=left|
|-align=center
|Win|| 32-22-4 ||align=left| Sergio Dario Cabrera
||| 6 ||   || align=left|  
|align=left|
|-align=center
|Loss|| 31-22-4 ||align=left| Patrick Lopez
||| 8 ||   || align=left|  
|align=left|
|-align=center
|Win|| 31-21-4 ||align=left| Jose Montes
||| 6 ||   || align=left|  
|align=left|
|-align=center
|Loss|| 30-21-4 ||align=left| Mercito Gesta
||| 8 ||   || align=left|  
|align=left|
|-align=center
|Loss|| 30-20-4 ||align=left| Hector Serrano
||| 6 ||   || align=left|  
|align=left|
|-align=center
|Loss|| 30-19-4 ||align=left| Sharif Bogere
||| 6 ||   || align=left|  
|align=left|
|-align=center
|Loss|| 30-18-4 ||align=left| Luis Ramos Jr
||| 6 ||   || align=left|  
|align=left|
|-align=center
|Loss|| 30-17-4 ||align=left| Donaldo Holguin
||| 10 ||   || align=left|  
|align=left|
|-align=center
|Loss|| 30-16-4 ||align=left| Hector Alatorre
||| 6 ||   || align=left|  
|align=left|
|-align=center
|Win|| 30-15-4 ||align=left| Roberto Vera Ibarra
||| 2 ||   || align=left|  
|align=left|
|-align=center
|Loss|| 29-15-4 ||align=left| Danny García
||| 8 ||   || align=left|  
|align=left|
|-align=center
|Loss|| 29-14-4 ||align=left| Juan Carlos Salgado
||| 6 ||   || align=left|  
|align=left|
|-align=center
|Win|| 29-13-4 ||align=left| Jorge Romero
||| 10 ||   || align=left|  
|align=left|
|-align=center
|Loss|| 28-13-4 ||align=left| Mercito Gesta
||| 8 ||   || align=left|  
|align=left|
|-align=center
|style="background: #dae2f1"|Draw|| 28-12-4 ||align=left| Noe Bolanos
||| 1 ||   || align=left|  
|align=left|
|-align=center
|Win|| 28-12-3 ||align=left| Efren Guerrero
||| 10 ||   || align=left|  
|align=left|
|-align=center
|Win|| 27-12-3 ||align=left| Valente Rojas
||| 4 ||   || align=left|  
|align=left|
|-align=center
|Loss|| 26-12-3 ||align=left| Vicente Escobedo
||| 8 ||   || align=left|  
|align=left|
|-align=center
|Loss|| 26-11-3 ||align=left| Román Martínez
||| 10 ||   || align=left|  
|align=left|
|-align=center
|Win|| 26-10-3 ||align=left| Miguel Angel Lopez
||| 10 ||   || align=left|  
|align=left|
|-align=center
|Win|| 25-10-3 ||align=left| Sergio Rivera
||| 10 ||   || align=left|  
|align=left|
|-align=center
|Loss|| 24-10-3 ||align=left| Ramon Montano
||| 10 ||   || align=left|  
|align=left|
|-align=center
|Win|| 24-9-3 ||align=left| Oscar Espinoza
||| 4,2:33 ||   || align=left|  
|align=left|
|-align=center
|Loss|| 23-9-3 ||align=left| Zaid Zavaleta
||| 9,1:25 ||   || align=left|  
|align=left|
|-align=center
|Win|| 23-8-3 ||align=left| Orlando Escobar
||| 8 ||   || align=left|   
|align=left|
|-align=center
|Loss|| 22-8-3 ||align=left| Wes Ferguson
||| 8 ||   || align=left|  
|align=left|
|-align=center
|Loss|| 22-7-3 ||align=left| David Díaz
||| 12 ||   || align=left|  
|align=left|
|-align=center
|Loss|| 22-6-3 ||align=left| Czar Amonsot
||| 8 ||   || align=left|  
|align=left|
|-align=center
|style="background: #dae2f1"|Draw|| 22-5-3 ||align=left| Efren Hinojosa
||| 8 ||   || align=left|  
|align=left|
|-align=center
|style="background: #dae2f1"|Draw|| 22-5-2 ||align=left| Baudel Cardenas
||| 10 ||   || align=left|  
|align=left|
|-align=center
|Loss|| 22-5-1 ||align=left| Javier Jáuregui
||| 10 ||   || align=left|  
|align=left|
|-align=center
|Loss|| 22-4-1 ||align=left| Steve Luevano
||| 10 ||   || align=left|  
|align=left|
|-align=center
|Win|| 22-3-1 ||align=left| Juan Ruiz
||| 6,1:44 ||   || align=left|  
|align=left|
|-align=center
|Loss|| 21-3-1 ||align=left| Marcos Licona
||| 10 ||   || align=left|  
|align=left|
|-align=center
|Win|| 21-2-1 ||align=left| Willie Jorrin
||| 10 ||   || align=left|  
|align=left|
|-align=center
|Loss|| 20-2-1 ||align=left| Priest Smalls
||| 12 ||   || align=left|  
|align=left| 
|-align=center
|Win|| 20-1-1 ||align=left| Phillip Payne
||| 12 ||   || align=left|  
|align=left| 
|-align=center
|Win|| 19-1-1 ||align=left| Martin Fing
||| 10 ||   || align=left|  
|align=left|
|-align=center
|Win|| 18-1-1 ||align=left| José Herrera
||| 5 ||   || align=left|  
|align=left|
|-align=center
|Win|| 17-1-1 ||align=left| Felix Bojorquez
||| 4 ||   || align=left|  
|align=left|
|-align=center
|Win|| 16-1-1 ||align=left| Horacio Rosas
||| 6 ||   || align=left|  
|align=left|
|-align=center
|style="background: #dae2f1"|Draw|| 15-1-1 ||align=left| Victor Manuel Dominguez
||| 10 ||   || align=left|  
|align=left|
|-align=center
|Loss|| 15-1 ||align=left| Martin Honorio
||| 10 ||   || align=left|  
|align=left|
|-align=center
|Win|| 15-0 ||align=left| Jose Salomon
||| 8 ||   || align=left|  
|align=left|
|-align=center
|Win|| 14-0 ||align=left| Mauricio Borquez
||| 1,1:34 ||   || align=left|  
|align=left|
|-align=center
|Win|| 13-0 ||align=left| Leobardo Roman
||| 6 ||   || align=left|  
|align=left|
|-align=center
|Win|| 12-0 ||align=left| Saul Lopez
||| 1 ||   || align=left|  
|align=left|
|-align=center
|Win|| 11-0 ||align=left| Abel Sepulveda
||| 1 ||   || align=left|  
|align=left|
|-align=center
|Win|| 10-0 ||align=left| Tomas Jurado
||| 1,1:20 ||   || align=left|  
|align=left|
|-align=center
|Win|| 9-0 ||align=left| Eliseo Valdez
||| 4 ||   || align=left|  
|align=left|
|-align=center
|Win|| 8-0 ||align=left| Daniel Hinojosa
||| 5 ||   || align=left|  
|align=left|
|-align=center
|Win|| 7-0 ||align=left| Emir Hernandez
||| 3 ||   || align=left|  
|align=left|
|-align=center
|Win|| 6-0 ||align=left| Noe Acosta
||| 3 ||   || align=left|  
|align=left|
|-align=center
|Win|| 5-0 ||align=left| Jose Salomon
||| 5 ||   || align=left|  
|align=left|
|-align=center
|Win|| 4-0 ||align=left| Jesus Armenta
||| 2 ||   || align=left|  
|align=left|
|-align=center
|Win|| 3-0 ||align=left| Victor Armenta
||| 4 ||   || align=left|  
|align=left|
|-align=center
|Win|| 2-0 ||align=left| Domingo Espinoza
||| 4 ||   || align=left|  
|align=left|
|-align=center
|Win|| 1-0 ||align=left| Genaro Valencia
||| 2 ||   || align=left|   
|align=left|

References

External links

Mexican male boxers
Boxers from Sinaloa
Sportspeople from Los Mochis
Welterweight boxers
1979 births
Living people